Camming may refer to:

 Camming out
 Cam (bootleg)
 Spring-loaded camming device
Electronic camming, a function of motion control
 Using a webcam
 Working as a webcam model